Pedro Antonio del Carmen Díaz de Obaldía (5 July 1852 – 8 May 1919) was one of the presidential designates of Panama in 1918 and in that capacity also acting President of Panama from 1 October 1918 to 12 October 1918.

He was elected as the third presidential designate by the National Assembly for the term 1916-1918 and as the second presidential designate for the term 1918-1920. He died before completing his term.

References

1852 births
1919 deaths
Vice presidents of Panama
Place of birth missing